Thomas Hilton (by 1508 – 1558 or later) was an English politician.

He was a Member (MP) of the Parliament of England for Old Sarum in 1529.

Hilton was appointed High Sheriff of Durham for 1532-33 and 1533–34 and High Sheriff of Northumberland for 1543–44.

References

Year of death missing
English MPs 1529–1536
Year of birth uncertain